The 1935 Tennessee Volunteers (variously Tennessee, UT, or the Vols) represented the University of Tennessee in the 1935 college football season. Playing as a member of the Southeastern Conference (SEC), the team was led by head coach W. H. Britton, in his first and only year as head coach, and played their home games at Shields–Watkins Field in Knoxville, Tennessee. They finished the season with a record of four wins and five losses (4–5 overall, 2–3 in the SEC). Britton was appointed head coach after Robert Neyland was called up to active military duty.

Schedule

Team players drafted into the NFL

Reference:

References

Tennessee
Tennessee Volunteers football seasons
Tennessee Volunteers football